The Lao River or Mae Lao River is a river in Chiang Rai Province, Northern Thailand. It is a tributary of the Kok River, with its mouth near Sum Pratu in Mueang Chiang Rai District. This river gives its name to the Mae Lao District.

The Lao River originates in the Phi Pan Nam Range and flows initially northwards across Wiang Pa Pao District and then northeastwards through the districts of Mae Suai, Mae Lao and Mueang Chiang Rai passing just south of Chiang Rai city.  
  
The Suai River, which gives its name to the Mae Suai District, is one of the main tributaries of the Lao River.

References

External links

Kok and Northern Mekong RBC
Thailand: flooding hit several northern and northeastern provinces
Some Selected Wetlands in the Mekong River Basin of Thailand
Kok River Basin in Thailand

Lao
Geography of Chiang Rai province